Campbell v. St. Tammany Parish School Board, 64 F.3d 184 (5th Cir. 1995), is a United States Court of Appeals, Fifth Circuit case involving a First Amendment challenge to the removal of a book from  public school libraries.

Facts
In 1992, a parent of a seventh-grade student enrolled in a St. Tammany Parish junior high school filed a complaint about the  inclusion of the book Voodoo & Hoodoo by Jim Haskins in the school library. The St. Tammany Parish School Board voted 12-2 to remove the book from all their school libraries. Parents of several students sued, alleging that, based on 42 U.S.C. § 1983 and 28 U.S.C. § 2201, the Board's removal of the book violated their children's First Amendment rights.  The district court granted summary judgment in the parents' favor.

Opinion
The Fifth Circuit analyzed the case in light of the 1982 United States Supreme Court decision Island Trees School District v. Pico, focusing on the school board's motivation to determine whether the removal of the book from the libraries violated students' First Amendment rights. The court found insufficient facts in the lower court's record to support summary judgment, and remanded on the issue of whether the school board's decision went beyond the bounds of constitutional discretion. The court's holding reinforced the public school library as warranting the “fundamental constitutional safeguards” as a public forum.

Impact
The Fifth Circuit's decision signaled the lasting impact of Island Trees School District v. Pico. The case was also notable for the court's decision to apply the rationale in Pico despite the fact that it was not a majority decision.

References 

United States Court of Appeals for the Fifth Circuit cases
Book censorship in the United States
Education in St. Tammany Parish, Louisiana
Libraries in Louisiana
Library law